There are several places in Southeast Asia that had its roots in the Kangchu system, an organised system of administration which was introduced by the Sultanate of Johore in the territories of Johore and Singapore in the 19th century to oversee the social affairs and economy of Chinese coolies who were working in gambier and pepper plantations. Even as the gambier and pepper trade declined in the early 20th century, many of these place names were retained as some of these settlers remained behind. Place names that are associated with the Kangchu system are named after former place features such as settlements, (or Chu Kang, Chinese: 厝港), river bases (or Kangkar, Chinese: 港脚) and port (or Kang, Chinese: 港). These terminologies are of Chinese origins, and draws its phonology from the Teochew dialect.

Malaysia

Johor

 Bukit Kangkar, Muar
 Kampong Kangkar, Chaah
 Kangkar Bahru, Yong Peng
 Kangkar Pulai, Johor Bahru
 Kangkar Tebrau, Johor Bahru
 Kangkar Kambau
 Kangkar Pendas
 Plentong

Singapore

Housing estates
 Choa Chu Kang
 Hougang
 Lim Chu Kang
 Sengkang
 Yio Chu Kang

Obsoleted names
 Tan Chu Kang
 Chan Chu Kang
 Lau Chu Kang

Others
 Lanfang Republic, Indonesia.
 Kangkar LRT Station, Singapore.

See also
 Kangchu system
 Kapitan Cina

Footnotes

References

Bibliography

 Dunlop, Peter K.G., Street Names of Singapore, Who's Who Publications, 2000
 Ooi, Keat Gin, Southeast Asia: A Historical Encyclopedia, from Angkor Wat to East Timor, ABC-CLIO, 2004, 
 Singam, Durai Raja, Place-Names in Peninsular Malaysia, Archipelago, 1980

Kangchu
Kangchu
Kangchu